Zodarion cesari is a spider species found in Spain.

See also 
 List of Zodariidae species

References

External links 

cesari
Spiders of Europe
Fauna of Spain
Spiders described in 2011